Two warships of Japan have borne the name Kaba:

 , a  launched in 1915 and struck in 1932
 , a  launched in 1945 and scrapped in 1948

Imperial Japanese Navy ship names
Japanese Navy ship names